John Butler may refer to:

Arts and entertainment
John "Picayune" Butler (died 1864), American performer
John Butler (artist) (1890–1976), American artist
John Butler (author) (born 1937), British author and YouTuber
John Butler (born 1954), member of Diesel Park West
John Butler (director) (born 1972), Irish screenwriter, director and novelist
John Butler (musician) (born 1975), Australian musician
John Butler Trio, his jam band
John Butler (album), its 1998 album
John Butler (Doctors), a fictional character from Doctors

Military
John Butler (Irish Confederate), officer of the Irish Confederate Army of the 1640s
John Butler (Ranger) (1728–1796), American-born military officer
John Butler (general) (died 1786), brigadier general of militia in North Carolina during the American Revolutionary War
John A. Butler (1910–1945), U.S. Marine Corps officer and Navy Cross recipient
John Fitzhardinge Paul Butler (1888–1916), English soldier and Victoria Cross recipient
John Clarence Butler (1921–1942), U.S. naval aviator
USS John C. Butler, a ship named in his honor
John G. Butler (inventor), 19th century officer in the U.S. Army Ordnance Corps who developed better shot for rifled cannon

Nobility
John Butler of Clonamicklon (died 1330), youngest son of Edmund Butler, Earl of Carrick
John Butler, 6th Earl of Ormond (died 1476)
John Butler of Kilcash (died 1570), third son of James Butler, 9th Earl of Ormond
John Butler, 1st Earl of Gowran (1643–1677), seventh son of James Butler, 1st Duke of Ormonde
John Butler, 12th Baron Dunboyne (1731–1800), Irish clergyman and aristocrat, Roman Catholic Bishop of Cork
John Butler, 17th Earl of Ormonde (1740–1795), Irish peer and Member of Parliament
John Butler, 2nd Marquess of Ormonde (1808–1854), Irish politician and peer
John Butler, 15th Earl of Ormonde (before 1744–1766)

Politics
John Butler (MP for Kent) (c. 1370–c. 1420)
John Butler (died 1423), MP for London
John Butler (died 1572 or 1573) (1503/04–1572/73), MP for Warwick
John Butler (died 1576) (1511/14–1576), MP for Hertfordshire
John Butler (died 1613), MP for Maldon
John Butler (Nova Scotia politician) (died 1791)
John Washington Butler (1875–1952), U.S. Representative for Tennessee
John Cornelius Butler (1887–1953), U.S. Congressman from New York
John Butler (Irish politician) (1891–1968), Irish Labour party politician from Waterford; member of the 4th Dáil
John Marshall Butler (1897–1978), American politician in Maryland
John D. Butler (1915–2010), American Republican politician and mayor of San Diego
John Edward Butler (1916–1999), member of the Legislative Assembly of Alberta from 1975 to 1979
John E. Butler, American politician, lawyer, and newspaper editor from Maine

Religion
John Butler (Jesuit) (1727–1786), Jesuit priest
John Butler (priest) (died 1682), Canon of Windsor
John Butler (bishop) (1717–1802), bishop of Oxford
John Gare Butler (1781–1841), clergyman of New Zealand
John Jay Butler (1814–1891), ordained minister and professor of systematic theology
John George Butler (1826–1909), Lutheran clergyman; Chaplain of the U.S. Senate and House of Representatives
John Joseph Butler (1883–1966), Catholic priest

Sports

American football
John Butler (American football coach) (born 1973), American football assistant coach since the 1990s
John Butler (American football executive) (1946–2003), general manager in the National Football League
John Butler (defensive back) (born 1965), National football league player with the San Francisco 49ers
John Butler (running back) (1918–1963), National Football League player from 1942 to 1945

Association football
John Butler (footballer, born 1937) (1937–2010), English footballer
John Butler (footballer, born 1962), English footballer
John Butler (footballer, born 1969), Scottish footballer

Other sports
John Butler (cricketer) (1863–1945), English cricketer
John Butler (athlete) (1871–1959), British Olympic athlete
John Butler (baseball) (1879–1950), catcher in Major League Baseball from 1901 to 1907
John Butler (basketball) (born 2002), American basketball player
Johnny Butler (1893–1967), baseball player
John Butler (rugby league) (born 1949), English rugby league footballer
John Butler (jockey), rider in the 1847 Grand National steeplechase

Other fields
John O. Butler, American dentist and periodontist
John M. Butler (scientist), expert on forensic DNA typing
John Alfred Valentine Butler, English physical chemist
John Dixon Butler, British architect
John Butler (actor) (1884–1967), actor in The Yellow Cab Man
John S. Butler, founding member of the American Psychiatric Association

See also
Butler dynasty
Jack Butler (disambiguation)
John Boteler (disambiguation)
John Butler Smith (1838–1914), American manufacturer and politician
Jonathan Butler (born 1961), South African singer-songwriter

Butler, John